Tío Pujio is a village located in the General San Martín Department in the Province of Córdoba in central Argentina.

References

Populated places in Córdoba Province, Argentina